Diploicia is a genus of lichenized fungi in the family Caliciaceae. The genus has a widespread distribution, especially in temperate regions, and contains 6 species.

Species list
The following species are accepted in the genus Diploicia by Species Fungorum:
Diploicia canescens  (1852)
Diploicia endopyxinea  (2016)
Diploicia glebosa  (2016)
Diploicia leproidica  (2016)
Diploicia neotropica  (2016)
Diploicia squamulosa  (2016)

References

Gallery

Caliciales
Lichen genera
Caliciales genera
Taxa described in 1852
Taxa named by Abramo Bartolommeo Massalongo